Janq'u Ch'utu (Aymara janq'u white, ch'utu peak of a mountain, top of the head, also spelled Jankho Chuto) is a  mountain in the Andes of Bolivia. It is located in the Oruro Department, Sabaya Province, Sabaya Municipality. Janq'u Ch'utu lies northeast of Churi Qullu.

References 

Mountains of Oruro Department